La Misión or Misión de San Miguel is a village in Baja California located on Mexican Federal Highway 1 approximately  south of the San Ysidro border crossing on the Gold Coast of the Baja California peninsula. The census of 2010 reported a population of 920 inhabitants. La Mision is so small, it is often simply referred to as "K-44" or "kilometro 44", which is its nearest highway marker.

The ruins of Misión San Miguel Arcángel de la Frontera can be found near the center of the village.

Climate

References

 2010 census tables: INEGI

External links
Door of Faith Orphanage

Cities in Ensenada Municipality